Chamberlayne  may  refer to:

Chamberlayne (surname)
Chamberlayne, Virginia, United States
Chamberlayne Elementary School, Henrico County, Virginia, U.S.A.
Chamberlayne Junior College,  Newton, Massachusetts

See also
Chamberlain (disambiguation)
Chamberlin (disambiguation)